There are two kinds of public holidays in Slovenia – state holidays and work-free days. State holidays are those celebrated by the state. These include official functions and flying the national flag. The latter are actually Catholic religious holidays, which are equivalent to any Sunday: companies and schools are closed, but there is no official celebration.

9 of 14 state holiday days are work-free, and there are additional 6 work-free days in Slovenia. Two of them always fall on Sunday, thus, there are effectively at most 13 work-free days in Slovenia.

State holidays that are work-free are shown in pale green, while work-free days that are not state holidays (coinciding with Catholic religious holidays) are shown in blue.

Table

Other holidays
In addition to these, several other holidays are traditionally and popularly celebrated by the people of Slovenia, although not being work-free. The best known are:
 Carnival (pust, date varies),
 Slovenian Maritime Day, 7 March
 International Women's Day, 8 March
 St. George's Day (jurjevanje, the welcoming of spring; 23 April),
 St. Martin's Day (martinovanje, changing of must into wine; 11 November)
 Saint Nicholas Day (miklavž, when children receive presents; 6 December)
 Insurrection Day (dan vstaje, 22 July, work-free until 1991)

See also
 Public holidays in Yugoslavia

References

External links
 Holidays and Days off in the Republic of Slovenia Act. Retrieved 14 May 2012.

 
Slovenia
Slovenian culture
Society of Slovenia
Observances in Slovenia
Holidays